The 2nd constituency of the Saône-et-Loire is a French legislative constituency in the Saône-et-Loire département.

Description

The 2nd constituency of the Saône-et-Loire covers the southwestern portion of the department, The constituency has no major urban centre but does include the town of Marcigny, which is famous for the ceramics factory of Émile Henry Ltd.

Politically the seat has swung between left and right, between 1988 and 1997 it was held by Jean-Marc Nesme of the UDF who re-captured the seat in 2002 this time running as a UMP candidate.

Historic Representation

Election results

2022

 
 
|-
| colspan="8" bgcolor="#E9E9E9"|
|-

2017

 
 
 
 
 
 
 
 
|-
| colspan="8" bgcolor="#E9E9E9"|
|-

2012

 
 
 
 
 
|-
| colspan="8" bgcolor="#E9E9E9"|
|-

Sources
Official results of French elections from 2002: "Résultats électoraux officiels en France" (in French).

2